Christ Healing the Blind is a  oil painting on canvas by Philippe de Champaigne.

References

Paintings in the collection of the Timken Museum of Art
Blindness